Picrew is a layered paper doll-style avatar maker website. It was initially developed by the two staff of the Japanese company TetraChroma Inc from July 2017, and officially released in December 2018.

The website's concept and interface have some similarities to earlier avatar editing systems, including Nintendo's Mii avatars and WeeMee, and the longer history of digital paper doll games such as Kisekae Set System.
Picrew has become popular with audiences outside of Japan, with the simplicity of the image maker and the potential for users to contribute their own Picrew avatar maker illustrations through a Picrew creator.  Picrew sets some restrictions in its terms of use, including the prohibition of re-distribution of the images created through Picrew image makers.  Individual creators control some of the rights to the resulting images from their image makers.

See also
Avatar (computing)
Mii
Avatar (Xbox)
PlayStation Home#Avatar
WeeMee

References

External links

Virtual avatars
Japanese websites
Internet properties established in 2018